Yağmuralan, historically Muzerrin ( or ), is a village in the Nizip District, Gaziantep Province, Turkey. The village is inhabited by Turkmens of the Barak tribe and had a population of 281 in 2022.

References

Villages in Nizip District